Claudio Giovannesi (born 20 March 1978) is an Italian film director and screenwriter.

Biography
After graduating in Modern Letters at the Sapienza University of Rome and in Film Directing at the Experimental Film Centre, Giovannesi directed his first film La casa sulle nuvole in 2008 and presented the movie at the Brussels Film Festival.

In 2012, Giovannesi directed his second feature film Alì ha gli occhi azzurri that won the Special Jury Prize and the Best First and Second Feature Award at the Rome Film Festival, while his third film Fiore was presented at the 2016 Cannes Film Festival's Directors' Fortnight.

In 2019, Giovannesi fourth feature film Piranhas, based on the novel by Roberto Saviano, took part to the 69th Berlin International Film Festival main competition, receiving critical acclaim and winning the Silver Bear for Best Screenplay.

Filmography

Film
 La casa sulle nuvole (The House on the Clouds, 2008)
 Alì ha gli occhi azzurri (Alì Blue Eyes, 2012)
 Fiore (2016)
 Piranhas (2019)

TV
 Gomorrah (2016, 2 episodes)

Awards and nominations
 Rome Film Festival
 2012: Special Jury Prize — Alì ha gli occhi azzurri
 2012: Best First and Second Feature Award — Alì ha gli occhi azzurri
 2012: Nominated for Golden Marco Aurelio for Best Picture — Alì ha gli occhi azzurri
 Cannes Film Festival
 2016: Nominated for Queer Palm — Fiore
 Berlin International Film Festival
 2019: Silver Bear for Best Screenplay — Piranhas
 2019: Nominated for Golden Bear — Piranhas
 David di Donatello Awards
 2017: Nominated for Best Film — Fiore
 2017: Nominated for Best Director — Fiore
 2017: Nominated for Best Screenplay — Fiore
 Nastro d'Argento Awards
 2013: Nominated for Best Director — Alì ha gli occhi azzurri
 2017: Nominated for Best Picture — Fiore
 2017: Nominated for Best Screenplay — Fiore

References

External links
 
 

1978 births
Living people
Film people from Rome
Italian film directors
Italian male screenwriters
Italian screenwriters
Silver Bear for Best Screenplay winners